The Buccellato is a cake typical of Lucca, Italy which is eaten all year, especially during the demonstrations of the Exaltation of the Holy Cross and Crossbow held in Lucca in September.

Buccellato di Lucca derives its name from the Latin Buccella, or bite, to the ancient Romans buccellatum the format was a round loaf of bread or a crown buccellae.

The modern Buccellato di Lucca retains its original ring shape, and is widely found on Luccan tables as a sweet Sunday recandolo, carried home on the forearm after attending mass. It is today occasionally also straight in shape, which is more convenient to carry in a bag.

Buccellato di Lucca's sweet flavor and dark brown color and gloss result from a sugar and egg glaze applied to the crust. There is a slight cut on the upper crust that facilitates rising, and the interior is soft and sweet, filled with sultana raisins and aniseed.

See also 
 Ka'ak

References 
 Recipe of the Buccellato di Lucca

External link

Italian breads
Sweet breads
Yeast breads
Holiday foods
Anise